Günay Karacaoğlu (born 13 March 1971) is a Turkish actress.

Karacaoğlu was born on 13 March 1971 in Kayseri as the third child of her family. She moved with her family to Istanbul in 1976. During her high school years, she participated in a theatre festival where she was awarded as the Best Actress.

In 1991, she enrolled in the Müjdat Gezen Art Center and graduated in 1995. Karacaoğlu made her debut as an actress in 1994 with a recurring role in the series Şehnaz Tango. She played leading role in hit comedy series "Yarım Elma" with Janset Paçal. She is also known for her role in the 2010 series Gönülçelen, in which she starred alongside Tuba Büyüküstün and Cansel Elçin. An award-winning stage actress, Karacaoğlu went on stage in a one-woman show titled AşkÖlsün in 2019. In 2020, she was cast in a leading role in the ATV comedy drama Gençliğim Eyvah.

Filmography 

 Sevda Mecburi İstikamet (Film) 2023 Fatoş
 Evlat Olsa Sevilmez (Film) 2022
 Aşk Mantık İntikam (TV series) 2021–2022 Zümrüt
 Gençliğim Eyvah (TV series) 2020 Hacer Asmalı
 Hayati ve Diğerleri (TV series) 2017–2018
 Cingöz Recai: Bir Efsanenin Dönüşü (Film) 2017
 Yaşamak Güzel Şey (Film) 2017
 Roman Havası (TV series) 2014 Elmas 
 Avrupa Avrupa (TV series) 2013 Saadet Gürleyen
 20 Dakika (TV series) 2013 Akrep
 İstanbulun Altınları (TV series) 2011 Uğur
 Gönülçelen (TV series) 2010  Gülnaz  
 Bana Bunlarla Gel (TV series)  2010   
 Aşkım Aşkım (TV series)  2008  Hadise (episode 13)  
 Osmanlı Cumhuriyeti  2008  Florist  
 Hemşire Meri (TV series)  2008  Meri  
 Düş Yakamdan (TV series)  2007  Şahane  
 Dünyayı Kurtaran Adamın Oğlu   2006  Teorik Tuğçe  
 Kısmet (TV series)  2005  Kısmet  
 Hayat Bilgisi (TV series)  2003  Hediye 
 İnşaat  2003  TV presenter 
 Bayanlar Baylar (TV series)  2002  Zakkum  
 Yarım Elma (TV series)  2002  Gonca  
 Beşibiryerde (TV series)  2002   
 Bizim Otel (TV series)  2001  Naciye  
 Yeditepe İstanbul (TV series)  2001  Önem  
 Abuzer Kadayıf  2000  Yazgülü  
 Üzgünüm Leyla (TV series)  2000   
 Kahpe Bizans  1999  Anaç Hatun  
 Hayvanlara Dokunduk (TV series)  1997  Fatma  
 Köşe Kapmaca (TV series)  1996  Handan  
 Şehnaz Tango (TV series)  1994  Hasene

Awards 
 2009: Muhsin Ertuğrul Theatre Awards, "Best Actress in a Comedy Role"
 2009: Sadri Alışık Theatre Awards, "Best Actress in a Comedy Role"
 2009: Afife Jale Theatre Awards, "Best Actress in a Comedy Role"
 2018: XVIII. Direct Audience Awards, "Best Comedy Actress", Artiz Mektebi, Müjdat Gezen Theatre

References

External links 
 

1971 births
Turkish television actresses
Turkish film actresses
Turkish stage actresses
Living people